Chunri can refer to:

Chunri, Pingtung, a township in Taiwan
Chunri, an alternative name for the dupatta, a long scarf worn by South Asian women 
Chunri (TV series), a Pakistani television drama